In the Pink may refer to:

 In the Pink (film), a 1967 cartoon in The Pink Panther series
 In the Pink (James Galway and Henry Mancini album), 1984
 In the Pink (Donna Lewis album), 2008
 In the Pink, a 1996 compilation album by The Psychedelic Furs
 In The Pink (group), an a cappella group from Oxford University
 "In the Pink", a business-related game run by the Financial Times
 In The Pink, a 2019 short film directed by Buğra Mert Alkayalar

See also
 In the Pink of the Night, a 1969 cartoon in the Pink Panther series